Barbora Malíková (born 30 December 2001) is a Czech athlete. She competed in the women's 400 metres event at the 2020 Summer Olympics.

References

External links
 

2001 births
Living people
Czech female sprinters
Athletes (track and field) at the 2020 Summer Olympics
Olympic athletes of the Czech Republic
Sportspeople from Opava
Athletes (track and field) at the 2018 Summer Youth Olympics
Youth Olympic gold medalists for the Czech Republic
Youth Olympic gold medalists in athletics (track and field)
Olympic female sprinters